Glutamic--pyruvic transaminase 2 is a protein that in humans is encoded by the GPT2 gene.

Function

This gene encodes a mitochondrial alanine transaminase, a pyridoxal enzyme that catalyzes the reversible transamination between alanine and 2-oxoglutarate to generate pyruvate and glutamate. Alanine transaminases play roles in gluconeogenesis and amino acid metabolism in many tissues including skeletal muscle, kidney, and liver. Activating transcription factor 4 upregulates this gene under metabolic stress conditions in hepatocyte cell lines. A loss of function mutation in this gene has been associated with developmental encephalopathy. Alternative splicing results in multiple transcript variants. [provided by RefSeq, Apr 2015].

References

Further reading